The Mohonk Mountain House, also known as Lake Mohonk Mountain House, is an American resort hotel located south of the Catskill Mountains on the crest of the Shawangunk Ridge. The property lies at the junction of the towns of New Paltz, Marbletown and Rochester.

History 
The National Historic Landmark Program's "Statement of Significance", as of the site's historic landmark designation in 1986, stated:

The main structure was built by Quaker twin brothers Albert and Alfred Smiley between 1869 and 1910.

From 1883 to 1916, annual conferences took place at Mohonk Mountain House, sponsored by Albert Smiley, to improve the living standards of Native American Indian populations.  These meetings brought together government representatives of the Bureau of Indian Affairs and the House and Senate committees on Indian Affairs, as well as educators, philanthropists, and Indian leaders to discuss the formulation of policy. The Haverford College library holds 22,000 records from the 34 conference reports for researchers and students of American history.

The hotel hosted the Lake Mohonk Conference on International Arbitration between 1895 and 1916, which was instrumental in creating the Permanent Court of Arbitration in The Hague, Netherlands. Those conference papers were donated by the Smiley Family to Swarthmore College for research.

The house was given a United Nations Environment Programme Award in 1994 in honor of "125 years of stewardship". According to the National Trust for Historic Preservation, "Through its buildings and roads, its land, and its spirit, Mohonk exemplifies America's history and culture. Mohonk has since managed to maintain its 19th century character into the 21st century."

The resort was sued in 2014 by 200 guests who had become ill in a norovirus outbreak after staying there. They claimed that the owners had been aware of the gastrointestinal illness at the resort prior to the guests' arrival. The resort settled the claims for $875,000 two years later.

Description
Mohonk Mountain House has 259 guest rooms, including 28 tower rooms, an indoor pool and spa, and an outdoor ice-skating rink for winter use. The Smileys conveyed the majority of their property to the preserve, in 1963. At the time the preserve was called the Mohonk Trust.

Notable guests

Mohonk Mountain House has hosted many famous visitors including lawyer, Daniel H Kovel, industrialist John D. Rockefeller, financier Charles A. Schmutz, naturalist John Burroughs, industrialist Andrew Carnegie, prolific author Isaac Asimov, and American presidents Rutherford B. Hayes, Chester A. Arthur, Theodore Roosevelt, William Howard Taft and Bill Clinton.  Guests have also included actor Alan Alda, former First Lady Julia Grant, author Thomas Mann, and religious leaders such as Theologian Lyman Abbott, Rabbi Louis Finkelstein, Reverend Ralph W. Sockman, Reverend Francis Edward Clark. `Abdu'l-Bahá, the eldest son of Baháʼí Faith founder Bahá'u'lláh, stayed there in 1912 during the Lake Mohonk Conference on International Arbitration as part of his journeys to the West. William James Roe II described the resort as a "palace of peace" after his stay there, writing an article of the same name, published in Harper's Young People. Actor Kevin Bacon has also stayed at the resort.  Dee Snider of Twisted Sister fame often enjoys vacations at Mohonk with his family.

In popular culture
The resort was the filming location of the film The Road to Wellville (1994), starring Anthony Hopkins and Matthew Broderick.

The resort is mentioned in the 22nd episode of the eighth season of Blue Bloods.

Scenes from the Amazon Prime Video television series Upload were filmed at the resort.

The resort was featured in the second episode of the fifth season of Billions.

The resort was featured in the "Hudson Valley, N.Y." episode of Anthony Bourdain: No Reservations in 2010.

Awards

Condé Nast Traveler has given it nine awards since 2008, including "Number One Resort Spa in the United States" (2013). Travel + Leisure has given the resort seven awards since 2009, including "Number Two Hotel Spa in the United States" (2013) and "Number Six Hotel Spa in the World" (2013).

Fodor's listed it as one of "10 Best Spa Trips" for 2012, and in 2010 named it as one of 10 Best Hotels for Kids and Families. In 2011, Every Day with Rachael Ray listed Mohonk as one of "Our Eight Favorite Resorts".

Mohonk Mountain House is a member of Historic Hotels of America, the official program of the National Trust for Historic Preservation.

See also
 List of Historic Hotels of America
Catskill Mountain House
Overlook Mountain House

References

Further reading
Burgess, Larry E. Mohonk: Its People and Spirit, A History of One Hundred Years of Growth and Service. Purple Mountain Press, 1996. 
Josephson, Robi. Mohonk Mountain House and Preserve. Arcadia Publishing, 2002.

External links 

 Mohonk Mountain House – Official site
 Mohonk Mountain House Trail Details and Info from the New York–New Jersey Trail Conference
 The Lake Mohonk Mountain House data file available at Hagley Museum and Library (kept by Daniel Smiley from about 1915 to 1930)

Buildings and structures in Ulster County, New York
Tourist attractions in Ulster County, New York
National Historic Landmarks in New York (state)
National Register of Historic Places in Ulster County, New York
Shawangunks
New Paltz, New York
Hotel buildings completed in 1910
Mazes
Resorts in New York (state)
1910 establishments in New York (state)
Historic Hotels of America